Lauren Gale may refer to:
 Lauren Gale (sprinter) (born 2000) Canadian track and field athlete
 Lauren "Laddie" Gale (1917–1996), American basketball player